Orpheus Britannicus is a collection of songs by Henry Purcell, published posthumously in London in two volumes, the first in 1698 and the second in 1702. In the preface to the first volume, Henry Playford, the printer of the volume and the son of John Playford, the famous printer and publisher of music books, extolls Purcell's skill as setter of English texts.

The portrait on the frontispiece was based on John Closterman's portrait of Purcell, currently in the National Portrait Gallery.

The first publication of a section of Purcell's opera Dido and Aeneas was the air "Ah! Belinda" in Orpheus Britannicus, transposed up one step, from C to D.

Henry Hall, who had studied composition with Purcell under John Blow, wrote the dedicatory poems at the beginning of each volume, (1698 and 1702) and also wrote one for Blow's Amphion Anglicus.

The later 1706 London printing of Orpheus Britannicus by William Pearson utilized a new style of music printing to great success, where the notehead was in one piece with the background staff.

John Blow's Amphion Anglicus (1700), a collection of Blow's songs, excerpts from odes, and chamber music, was published by subscription, after Orpheus Britannicus''' success, and even shows a certain symmetry in title.

A later engraver, Cole Benjamin (fl 1740–1760), printed as Orpheus Britannicus a seemingly unrelated set of engravings which he had made originally for The New Universal Magazine (1751–9).

Benjamin Britten, working with Peter Pears, realized (arranged) and edited a number of songs from Orpheus Britannicus for both solo singer with piano  as part of Britten's Purcell Realizations.

References
Stanley Boorman. "Printing and Publishing of Music: 3. Printing from type (ii) Early History", Grove Music Online, ed. L. Macy (accessed November 30, 2006), grovemusic.com (subscription access).
Peter Holman, Robert Thompson. "Henry Purcell", Grove Music Online, ed. L. Macy (accessed November 30, 2006), grovemusic.com (subscription access).
Bruce Wood. "Henry Hall (i)", Grove Music Online, ed. L. Macy (accessed November 30, 2006), grovemusic.com (subscription access).
Curtis Price. "Dido and Aeneas", Grove Music Online, ed. L. Macy (accessed November 30, 2006), grovemusic.com (subscription access).
Bruce Wood. "John Blow: 1.Life", Grove Music Online, ed. L. Macy (accessed November 30, 2006), grovemusic.com (subscription access).
Jennifer Doctor, Judith LeGrove, Paul Banks. "Benjamin Britten: Arrangements by Britten: Purcell Realizations and Editions", Grove Music Online'', ed. L. Macy (accessed November 30, 2006), grovemusic.com (subscription access).

Notes

Music books